Mohd Khairi bin Kiman (born 3 March 1984) is a Malaysian footballer who plays as a defender for Malaysia Premier League side, Perlis FA.

The full-back previously has played for Johor FC for 10 years. He joined Perak for the 2013 Malaysia Super League season, making his league debut for Perak on 8 January 2013 against PBDKT T-Team FC. On 11 January, he received his first red card for Perak in the league game against his old club, the newly named Darul Takzim FC. He was not retained by Perak for the 2014 Malaysia Super League season squad, and his contract with Perak was terminated in early April 2014 due to his long-term injuries.

References

1984 births
Living people
Malaysian people of Malay descent
Malaysian footballers
Johor Darul Ta'zim F.C. players
Perak F.C. players
Perlis FA players
Association football defenders